The Deputy Prime Minister of Kazakhstan is a member in the Government of Kazakhstan. The post is usually led by multiple people who carry out their activities in accordance with the policies established by the Prime Minister of Kazakhstan and are appointed by the President of Kazakhstan who are approved by the Parliament of Kazakhstan.

List of deputy prime ministers

References 

Government of Kazakhstan
Deputy Prime Ministers of Kazakhstan